Liver X receptor alpha (LXR-alpha) is a nuclear receptor protein that in humans is encoded by the NR1H3 gene (nuclear receptor subfamily 1, group H, member 3).

Expression 

miRNA hsa-miR-613 autoregulates the human LXRα gene by targeting the endogenous LXRα through its specific miRNA response element (613MRE) within the LXRα 3′-untranslated region. LXRα autoregulates its own suppression via induction of SREBP1c which upregulates miRNA has-miR-613.

Function 

The liver X receptors, LXRα (this protein) and LXRβ, form a subfamily of the nuclear receptor superfamily and are key regulators of macrophage function, controlling transcriptional programs involved in lipid homeostasis and inflammation. Additionally, they play an important role in the local activation of thyroid hormones via deiodinases. The inducible LXRα is highly expressed in liver, adrenal gland, intestine, adipose tissue, macrophages, lung, and kidney, whereas LXRβ is ubiquitously expressed. Ligand-activated LXRs form obligate heterodimers with retinoid X receptors (RXRs) and regulate expression of target genes containing LXR response elements. Restoration of LXR-alpha expression/function within a psoriatic lesion may help to switch the transition from psoriatic to symptomless skin.

Interactions 

Liver X receptor alpha has been shown to interact with EDF1 and Small heterodimer partner. LXRα activates the transcription factor SREBP-1c, resulting in lipogenesis.

Link to multiple sclerosis 
In 2016, a study found 70% of individuals in two families with a rare form of rapidly progressing multiple sclerosis had a mutation in NR1H3. However, an analysis from The International Multiple Sclerosis Genetics Consortium using a 13-fold larger sample size could not find any evidence that the mutation in question (p.Arg415Gln) associated with multiple sclerosis, refuting these findings.

References

Further reading

External links 
 
 

Intracellular receptors
Transcription factors